The Marine Artillery Scout Observer Course (MASOC) is a forward observer training program intended to prepare United States Marines for the MOS #0861 (Fire Support Man).  The training is held at Fort Sill, Oklahoma.

United States Marine Corps schools